Abdoulaye Cissoko (born 27 December 1999) is a French professional footballer who currently plays for MLS side Seattle Sounders FC.

Career
Cissoko appeared for his local side Les Ulis, playing in the French Championnat National 3, in both 2018 and 2019. In 2019, Cissoko moved to the United States to play with third-tier side San Diego 1904 in the NISA.

Following his time with San Diego Zest, Cissoko moved to USL Championship side Tacoma Defiance on 6 September 2019. He was immediately loaned to NISA side San Diego 1904 ahead of their inaugural season.

On 21 May 2021, Cissoko moved up to MLS side Seattle Sounders FC, the parent club of Tacoma. On 19 June 2021, following the international break, Cissoko made his debut for the Sounders in an away win against the Western Conference rivals, Los Angeles Galaxy.

Personal life
Born in France, Cissoko is of Senegalese descent.

Career statistics

Club

References

External links

1999 births
Living people
People from Sèvres
Footballers from Hauts-de-Seine
French footballers
French sportspeople of Senegalese descent
Association football defenders
Championnat National 3 players
CO Les Ulis players
Major League Soccer players
USL Championship players
National Independent Soccer Association players
USL League Two players
San Diego Zest players
Tacoma Defiance players
Seattle Sounders FC players
French expatriate footballers
Expatriate soccer players in the United States
French expatriate sportspeople in the United States
MLS Next Pro players